Gopal Krishna is a 1938 Marathi and Hindi mythological social film from Prabhat Film Company. The film was a remake of Prabhat Film Company's  first silent film Gopal Krishna (1929). It was made in Marathi and Hindi simultaneously. The film was directed by Sheikh Fattelal and V. G. Damle and starred Ram Marathe, Shanta Apte, Parshuram, Prahlad, Ulhas and Ganpatrao. The story was written by Shivram Vashikar and the music was by Krishnarao.

Based on the young Lord Krishna, the story is less mythology and more about a social awareness for change. The film was made during the pre-independent India era when the resentment against British rule was high. The film makers metaphorically used the story of the boy Krishna and the cowherds against the oppressive King Kamsa, portraying the feelings of the Indians against the British mainly through dialogue.

Plot
The story is based in Gokul where the young playful Krishna resides with his foster mother Yashodha and father Nanda. He tends cows along with other young cowherds. Gokul is ruled by the despotic King Kamsa who has Krishna's real parents in custody. He is intent on killing Krishna to prevent the prophecy of his death through Krishna coming true. Krishna incites the village people against Kamsa's oppressive regime. He prevents 500 cows being sent to Kamsa who demands that the people of Gokul do so. He battles  Kamsa's General Keshi and defeats him when he is sent to kill him. The only miracle shown in the film is when Kamsa unleashes rain (unlike the other Puranic stories where the rain is brought about by the Rain God Indra) and Krishna lifts the Govardhan hill to shelter the people under it.

Cast
 Ram Marathe as Krishna
 Shanta Apte as Radha
 Shankar as Anay
 Parsharam as Mansukh
 Prahlad as Kuns
 Ullhas as Keshi
 Manajirao as Nand
 Karunadevi as Yashoda

Production
The sets for the filming were constructed in Poona where the Prabhat film Company was situated. The cows needed for the shoot were transported from Dombivili a suburb in Bombay to Poona by train. The cattle were allowed to roam freely on the sets.

Soundtrack
Master Krishnarao was the music director and some of the songs are still popular today. The songs were sung by Hansa Apte, Ram Marathe and Parshuram and the lyricist was Pandit Anuj.

Songs

References

External links

1938 films
1930s Hindi-language films
Prabhat Film Company films
Articles containing video clips
Indian black-and-white films